Jubilee Synagogue, also known as the Jerusalem Synagogue for its location on Jerusalem Street, is an active synagogue in Prague, Czech Republic. It was built in 1906, designed by Wilhelm Stiassny and named in honor of the silver Jubilee of Emperor Franz Joseph I of Austria. Although originally built as a "reform" synagogue (with an organ and a choir), it is nowadays used by the more traditional ("modern orthodox") members of the Prague Jewish community, aligning itself officially with orthodox Judaism. Still, compared to the famous other active synagogue of Prague, the Old-New Synagogue, the Jubilee Synagogue is far less stringent in many ways.

Design and history 

The synagogue is designed in Moorish Revival form with Art Nouveau decoration, especially in the interior. It was lately renovated and still serves religious purposes. Since Czechoslovakia became independent in 1918, it has been called the Jerusalem Synagogue as the name Jubilee Synagogue referred to the anniversary of the rule of Franz Joseph I in the defeated Austro-Hungarian Monarchy.

The synagogue preserves inscribed plaques removed from the former Zigeuner Synagogue, demolished by the urban renewal campaign that was the cause of the building of the Jubilee synagogue.

The inscription over the entrance reads "זה השער ליי צדיקים יבאו בו" ("This is the gate to which the righteous will come").

The facade and form of the synagogue are a hybridized blend of Moorish Revival and Art Nouveau, with horseshoe arches on the facade and on the interior columns supporting the women's galleries in a three-bay building. The Mudéjar red-and-white coursing of the stone facade is particularly striking. Inside, the Moorish elements are overlaid with brilliantly painted Art Nouveau patterning.

After a century of being open to the public as a house of worship, except for the period of Nazi German occupation when it was used to store confiscated Jewish property, on 1 April 2008 the Jubilee Synagogue began opening its doors on a regular basis to tourists and aficionados of historic architecture.

See also 
 2006 Prague terror plot

References

Synagogues completed in 1906
Synagogues in Prague
Moorish Revival synagogues
Art Nouveau synagogues
Art Nouveau architecture in Prague
Moorish Revival architecture in the Czech Republic
New Town, Prague
1906 establishments in Austria-Hungary
20th-century religious buildings and structures in the Czech Republic